The football tournament in the Jeux de la Francophonie occurs every four years. It is contested by French-speaking nations and usually involves the use of youth national teams. Morocco, Canada and Congo are the only nations to have won the tournament twice.

Statistics

Performances by Countries

External links
  RSSSF Archive of football at Jeux de la Francophonie

 
Sports at the Jeux de la Francophonie
Jeux de la Francophonie